Richard Sleech D.D. (d. 2 March 1730) was a Canon of Windsor from 1722 to 1730.

Family

He was the son of Edward Sleech, organist of Eton College.

His son, Stephen Sleech, also entered the church, and followed his father as Rector of Farnham Royal.

Career

He was educated at King's College, Cambridge where he graduated BA in 1698, MA in 1701, and DD in 1720.

He was appointed:
Assistant Master and Fellow of Eton College 1715
Rector of Hitcham 1702 - 1730
Chaplain to the Bishop of Ely 1721
Rector of Farnham Royal 1721 - 1730

He was appointed to the sixth stall in St George's Chapel, Windsor Castle in 1722 and held this until he died in 1730.

He was buried in the chapel at Windsor on 4 March 1730.

Notes 

1730 deaths
Canons of Windsor
Alumni of King's College, Cambridge
Burials at St George's Chapel, Windsor Castle
Fellows of Eton College
Year of birth missing